The 2022 Philadelphia Union season  was the club's thirteenth season in Major League Soccer, the top flight of American soccer. The team is managed by Jim Curtin, his ninth season with the club. The club's regular season began on February 26, 2022, and concluded on October 9. Outside of MLS, the Union also competed in the 2022 U.S. Open Cup, entering in the Round of 32.

The club finished second in the Supporters' Shield standings and first in the Eastern Conference. The Union appeared in their first MLS Cup, where they lost to Shield winners Los Angeles FC in a penalty shootout.

Background

Ahead of the 2022 season, the Union saw major front office departures; technical director, Chris Albright was hired as the new General Manager of FC Cincinnati, and later assistant coach, Pat Noonan was announced as their new head coach. In January, former player and academy coach, Ryan Richter was promoted to assistant coach of the first team under Jim Curtin.

By mid-January, the Union had announced new contract agreements for starting centerbacks Jakob Glesnes and Jack Elliott, keeping both with the club through the 2024 season.

Ernst Tanner identified that part of the Union's offseason priorities were improving the forward/striker position. The first move for a new forward saw Julián Carranza, a young DP from Inter Miami CF, to be signed on loan for the 2022 season. In January, the Union traded their leading scorer (and 2021 CONCACAF Champions League Golden Boot winner), Kacper Przybyłko to the Chicago Fire FC for $1.15 million in allocation money. The outbound Przybyłko made way for the Union's marquee offseason signing in Danish Superliga Golden Boot winner, Mikael Uhre, to a three-year contract as a designated player. Signing Uhre broke the Union's transfer fee record
reportedly at $2.8 million. In February, the Union traded designated player midfielder, Jamiro Monteiro, to the San Jose Earthquakes for up to $450,000 and an international roster spot for the 2022 season.

The Union traded away or passed on all picks for the 2022 MLS SuperDraft, being the fourth consecutive season doing so. Continuing to sign young players through the Union's academy, left-back, Anton Sorenson, was officially signed to the first team as a homegrown player in January. Previously Sorenson had been granted an emergency hardship call-up for the 2021 Eastern Conference final in December.

2022 roster

Transfers

In

Out

Loan In

Loan Out

Competitions

Preseason
The Union's preseason fixtures were announced in January to be held during their preseason training in Clearwater, Florida.

Major League Soccer

Standings

Eastern Conference

Overall table

Results summary

Results by round

Results

MLS Cup Playoffs

MLS Cup

U.S. Open Cup

Statistics

Appearances and goals
Last updated February 9, 2023

|-
! colspan=14 style=background:#dcdcdc; text-align:center|Goalkeepers

|-
! colspan=14 style=background:#dcdcdc; text-align:center|Defenders

|-
! colspan=14 style=background:#dcdcdc; text-align:center|Midfielders

|-
! colspan=14 style=background:#dcdcdc; text-align:center|Forwards

|-

References

Philadelphia Union
Philadelphia Union seasons
Philadelphia Union
Philadelphia Union